Yakhi Lake is a lake located in the district of Choibalsan, in Dornod Province, Mongolia.

It is located at an altitude of 670 m, is 20.4 km long and 11.9 km wide and has an area of 97 km2. It has a maximum depth of 4 m.

References

Lakes of Mongolia
Dornod Province